Miguel Peirano may refer to:

 Miguel Gustavo Peirano (born 1966), Argentine economist and former government minister
 Miguel Peirano (footballer) (born 1960), former Uruguayan footballer